The Vilnius TV Tower is a  high tower in the Karoliniškės microdistrict of Vilnius, Lithuania.  It is the tallest structure in Lithuania, and it belongs to the SC Lithuanian Radio and Television Centre.

Design and construction

The tower was designed by V. Obydov and the engineering section by K. Balėnas. The construction of the tower started on 31 May 1974 and finished on December 30, 1980. The construction was funded by the 11th Five Year Plan of the Soviet Union, which had earmarked funds for strategic investment in the then Lithuanian SSR. Radio transmitters are housed in the lower part of the concrete tower with antennas attached to the steel spike.

The observation deck  from the ground houses the cafe "Paukščių takas", offers a picturesque view of the city and its surroundings, and sports a rotating platform that revolves once every 45 minutes. High-speed elevators reach the cafe from ground level in 40 seconds.

Museum
The TV tower played a major role in the events of 13 January 1991, when 14 unarmed civilians lost their lives and 700 were injured opposing the Soviet military seizure of the tower. A small museum dedicated to the January 1991 battle is housed on the ground floor, and various markers in the surrounding area indicate places where Lithuanian citizens died while trying to maintain the blockade against Soviet troops.

Decoration

Since 2000, the tower has been decorated to look like a Christmas tree each Christmas season. During the 2006 World Basketball Championship it was decorated with a large basketball net. Vilnius TV Tower became the biggest basketball hoop in the world during the 2011 FIBA European Basketball Championship. The hoop was 35 metres in diameter with a 40  metre-high net, assembled at a height of 170 metres. The lighting of the giant hoop took 2,560 metres of lighting cable and 545 bulbs.
Bungee jumps are available to the public from the roof of the observation deck.

Since 2019 tower decorations had changed. LED lighting was installed and the tower has been glowing bright blue color in the dark. During national celebrations, the tower changes its color according lithuanian flag colors - yellow, green and red, dimming into each other and glowing for 2 minutes in one color.

References

External links
 The Vilnius TV tower official website
 SC Lithuanian Radio and Television Centre official website
 

Buildings and structures in Vilnius
Towers built in the Soviet Union
Towers in Lithuania
Television in Lithuania
Towers completed in 1980
Towers with revolving restaurants
Radio masts and towers in Europe
Observation towers